This article serves as an index – as complete as possible – of all the honorific orders or similar decorations awarded by Norway, classified by Monarchies chapter and Republics chapter, and, under each chapter, recipients' countries and the detailed list of recipients.

MONARCHIES

Norwegian Royal Family 

See also decorations pages (mark °): Harald, Sonja, Haakon, Mette-Marit, Ingrid Alexandra, Mârtha Louise, Astrid

Norwegian citizens 

 Magne Hagen, former secretary to the King: Grand Cross of the Order of Saint Olav (2000)
 Carsten Smith, former Chief Justice of the Supreme Court of Norway: Grand Cross of the Order of Saint Olav (2003)
 Kjell Magne Bondevik, former Prime Minister: Grand Cross of the Order of Saint Olav (2004)
 Lars Petter Forberg, Master of the Royal Household : Grand Cross of the Order of Saint Olav (2004)

British Royal Family 

 Elizabeth II: Grand Cross with Collar of the  Order of Saint Olav (1955)
 Charles, Prince of Wales: Grand Cross with Collar of the  Order of Saint Olav (1978)
 Prince Andrew, Duke of York: Grand Cross of the Order of Saint Olav (1988)
 Prince Richard, Duke of Gloucester: Grand Cross of the  Order of Saint Olav (1973)
 The Duke of Kent: Grand Cross of the Order of Saint Olav

Swedish Royal Family 

 Carl XVI Gustaf of Sweden: Grand Cross with Collar of the Order of Saint Olav (1974)
 Queen Silvia of Sweden: Grand Cross of the Order of Saint Olav (1982)
 Victoria, Crown Princess of Sweden: Grand Cross of the Order of Saint Olav (1995)
 Prince Carl Philip, Duke of Värmland: Grand Cross of the Order of Saint Olav (2005)
 Princess Madeleine, Duchess of Hälsingland and Gästrikland: Grand Cross of the Order of Saint Olav (2005) 
 Princess Christina, Mrs. Magnuson: Grand Cross of the Order of Saint Olav (1992)
 Princess Désirée, Baroness Silfverschiöld: Grand Cross of the Order of Saint Olav (1992)

Danish Royal Family 
See also official pages, click on "Decorations" (mark °): Margrethe, Henrik, Frederik, Mary, Joachim, Benedikte''
 Margrethe II of Denmark: Grand Cross with Collar of the Order of St. Olav (1958) °
 Frederik, Crown Prince of Denmark:  Grand Cross of the Order of Saint Olav (1990) 
 Mary, Crown Princess of Denmark:  Grand Cross of the Order of Saint Olav (2005)
 Prince Joachim of Denmark: Grand Cross of the Order of Saint Olav (1991) °
 Princess Benedikte of Denmark: Grand Cross of the Royal Norwegian Order of St Olav (1974) °

Dutch Royal Family 

 King Willem-Alexander of the Netherlands: Grand Cross of the Order of St. Olav (1996)
 Princess Beatrix of the Netherlands: Grand Cross with Collar of the Order of St. Olav (1986)
 Princess Margriet of the Netherlands: Grand Cross of the Order of St. Olav
 Pieter van Vollenhoven: Grand Cross of the Royal Norwegian Order of Merit

Belgian Royal Family 

 King Philippe: Grand Cross of the Order of Saint Olav (2003) 
 Queen Mathilde: Grand Cross of the Order of Saint Olav (2003)
 King Albert II: Grand Cross (1964) with Collar of the Order of St. Olav 
 Queen Paola: Grand Cross of the Order of Saint Olav (1997) 
 Princess Astrid: Grand-Cross of the Royal Norwegian Order of Merit (2003) 
 Prince Lorenz: Grand-Cross of the Royal Norwegian Order of Merit (2003)
 Prince Laurent: Grand-Cross of the Royal Norwegian Order of Merit (2003)
 Princess Claire: Grand-Cross of the Royal Norwegian Order of Merit (2003)

Luxembourgish Grand-Ducal Family 

 Jean, Grand Duke of Luxembourg: Knight Grand Cross with Collar of the Order of St. Olav (1964)
 Henri, Grand Duke of Luxembourg: Knight Grand Cross (1996) with Collar (2011) of the Order of St. Olav
 Maria Teresa, Grand Duchess of Luxembourg: Knight Grand Cross of the Order of St. Olav (1996)

Spanish Royal Family 

 Juan Carlos I of Spain: Grand Cross with Collar of the Order of St. Olav (1982)
 Queen Sofía of Spain: Grand Cross of the Order of St. Olav (1982)
 Felipe, Prince of Asturias: Grand Cross of the Order of St. Olav (1995)
 Infanta Elena, Duchess of Lugo: Grand Cross of the Order of Saint Olav (1995)
 Infanta Cristina, Duchess of Palma de Mallorca: Grand Cross of the Order of Saint Olav (1995)

Jordanian Royal Family 
 Abdullah II of Jordan: Knight Grand Cross with collar of the Royal Norwegian Order of St. Olav (4.4.2000) 
 Queen Rania of Jordan: Knight Grand Cross of the Order of St. Olav (4.4.2000) 
 Princess Alia bint Al Hussein, daughter of Queen Dina of Jordan, half-sister of Abdullah II of Jordan: Grand Cross of the Royal Norwegian Order of Merit (4.4.2000) 
 Sayyid Mohammed Al-Saleh, Princess Alia's 2nd husband: Grand Cross of the Royal Norwegian Order of Merit (4.4.2000) 
 Princess Zein bint Al Hussein, daughter of Princess Muna of Jordan, full sister of Abdullah II and Princess Aisha's twin: Grand Cross of the Royal Norwegian Order of Merit (4.4.2000) 
 Sayyid Majdi Al-Saleh, Princess Zein's husband: Grand Cross of the Royal Norwegian Order of Merit (4.4.2000) 
 Prince Ali Bin Al-Hussein, son of Queen Alia of Jordan, half-brother of Abdullah II of Jordan: Grand Cross of the Royal Norwegian Order of Merit (4.4.2000) 
 Prince Hamzah bin Al Hussein son of Queen Noor of Jordan, half-brother of Abdullah II of Jordan:  Knight Grand Cross with collar of the Order of St. Olav 
 Prince Talal bin Muhammad, elder son of Muhammad bin Talal: Grand Cross of the Royal Norwegian Order of Merit (4.4.2000) 
 Princess Ghida Talal, Prince Talal's wife: Grand Cross of the Royal Norwegian Order of Merit (4.4.2000) 
 Prince Hassan bin Talal, youngest brother of King Hussein I of Jordan: Grand Cross of the Order of St. Olav

Thai Royal Family 
 Queen Sirikit of Thailand: Grand Cross of the Royal Norwegian Order of St. Olav (1965)

Japanese Imperial Family 

 Emperor Akihito: Grand Cross (1953) with Collar (2001) of the Order of St. Olav
 Empress Michiko: Grand Cross of the Order of St. Olav (2001)
 Crown Prince Naruhito: Grand Cross of the Order of St. Olav (2001)
 Crown Princess Masako: Grand Cross of the Order of St. Olav (2001)
 Princess Tomohito of Mikasa (Nobuko): Grand Cross of the Order of St. Olav (2001)

Former Monarchies

Greek Royal Family 
 former King Constantine II of Greece: Grand Cross (1962) with Collar (1964) of the Order of St. Olav

Iranian Imperial Family 
 former Empress Farah Pahlavi: Grand Cross of the Order of St. Olav (1965)

REPUBLICS

President Heinz Fischer: Knight Grand Cross of the Order of St. Olav (2007)

President Luiz Inácio Lula da Silva: Knight Grand Cross of the Order of St. Olav (2003)

President Georgi Parvanov: Knight Grand Cross of the Order of St. Olav (2006)

President Ivo Josipović: Knight Grand Cross of the Order of St. Olav (2011)

President Arnold Rüütel: Knight Grand Cross of the Order of St. Olav (2002)

President Martti Ahtisaari: Knight Grand Cross of the Order of St. Olav (1994)
 President Tarja Halonen: Knight Grand Cross of the Order of St. Olav (2000)
 President Sauli Niinistö: Knight Grand Cross of the Order of St. Olav (2012)

President Valéry Giscard d'Estaing (when Minister of Finance): Knight Grand Cross of the Order of St. Olav (1962)
 President Jacques Chirac (1995-2007): Knight Grand Cross of the Order of St. Olav (2000)

Marianne von Weizsäcker: Knight Grand Cross of the Order of St. Olav (1986)
 President Horst Köhler: Knight Grand Cross of the Order of St. Olav (2007)

President Vigdís Finnbogadóttir: Knight Grand Cross with Collar of the Order of St. Olav (1982)
 President Ólafur Ragnar Grímsson: Knight Grand Cross of the Order of St. Olav (1998)

President Guntis Ulmanis: Knight Grand Cross of the Order of St. Olav (1998)
 President Vaira Vīķe-Freiberga: Knight Grand Cross of the Order of St. Olav (2000)

President Valdas Adamkus: Knight Grand Cross of the Order of St. Olav (1998)
 President Dalia Grybauskaitė: Knight Grand Cross of the Order of St. Olav (2011)

President Lech Wałęsa: Knight Grand Cross of the Order of St. Olav (1995)
 President Aleksander Kwaśniewski: Knight Grand Cross of the Order of St. Olav (1996)

President António Ramalho Eanes: Knight Grand Cross with Collar of the Order of St. Olav (1978)
 President Jorge Sampaio: Knight Grand Cross of the Order of St. Olav (2004)
 President Aníbal Cavaco Silva: Knight Grand Cross of the Order of St. Olav (2008)

President Emil Constantinescu: Knight Grand Cross of the Order of St. Olav (1999)

President Ivan Gašparovič: Knight Grand Cross of the Order of St. Olav (2010)

President Danilo Türk: Knight Grand Cross of the Order of St. Olav (2011)

President Abdullah Gül: Knight Grand Cross of the Order of St. Olav (2013)

References 

Orders, decorations, and medals of Norway
Norway